Spilococcus is a genus of true bugs belonging to the family Pseudococcidae.

The genus has almost cosmopolitan distribution.

Species:
 Spilococcus alhagii (Hall, 1926) 
 Spilococcus andersoni (Coleman, 1903)

References

Pseudococcidae